John Peavey (born September 1, 1933) is a rancher and Democratic politician from Carey, Idaho. Peavey served in the Idaho Senate from 1969 to 1976 and from 1978 to 1994.

From a young age Peavey worked on the ranch founded by his grandfather, U.S. Senator John W. Thomas. In 1969 he succeeded his mother, Mary Brooks in the Idaho Senate as a Republican after she was appointed director of the United States Mint by President Richard M. Nixon.

In 1974, after repeated attempts to pass a Sunshine Law; a law requiring lobbyists to register and political campaign disclosure, in the legislature were unsuccessful, Peavey led a successful statewide campaign to pass one by ballot initiative.

In 1994 Peavey was the Democratic nominee for lieutenant governor. He was defeated by the Republican incumbent Butch Otter, who was later elected governor in 2006.

Elections

References

Idaho state senators
Idaho Republicans
Idaho Democrats
Northwestern University alumni
People from Twin Falls, Idaho
1933 births
Living people
People from Carey, Idaho